

History
The ECAC Northeast tournament began in 1972, after several teams formed the first third-tier ice hockey conference. For the first three years the championship was only a single game between the teams judged to be the top two in the conference. Because all games between ECAC teams regardless of division were counted the teams with the two best records weren't necessarily invited to play. In 1975 the tournament was expanded to 4 teams with one of the four chosen as the host. Host teams were dropped after 1977 with the higher-seeded teams playing at home afterwards. With the conference ballooning to more than two dozen teams, the conference tournament was expanded to 8 for 1984. Two years later the conference split into North and South divisions with each holding an individual 6-team postseason tournament and the two champions meeting to decide the conference champion. When the conference divided itself into three divisions for the 1992–93 season, the divisional tournament was scrapped and replaced with a single 8-team series. The top teams from each division were seeded 1-3 according to their overall conference records while the five teams with the best remaining conference records were seeded 4-8. In 1998 the conference abandoned divisional alignments but did not change the form of the conference tournament. A year later the four Division II programs in the conference played in a separate Division II tournament, allowing the remaining 14 teams to vie for the official ECAC Northeast championship with the champion receiving an automatic bid to the National Tournament.

1972

Note: * denotes overtime period(s)

1973

Note: * denotes overtime period(s)

1974

Note: * denotes overtime period(s)

1975

Note: team in italics served as host.

Note: * denotes overtime period(s)

1976

Note: team in italics served as host.

Note: * denotes overtime period(s)

1977

Note: team in italics served as host.

Note: * denotes overtime period(s)

1978

Note: * denotes overtime period(s)

1979

Note: * denotes overtime period(s)

1980

Note: * denotes overtime period(s)

1981

Note: * denotes overtime period(s)

1982

Note: * denotes overtime period(s)

1983

Note: * denotes overtime period(s)

1984

Note: * denotes overtime period(s)

1985

Note: * denotes overtime period(s)

1986

North

South

Note: * denotes overtime period(s)

1987

North

South

Note: * denotes overtime period(s)

1988

North

South

Note: * denotes overtime period(s)

1989

North

South

Note: * denotes overtime period(s)

1990

North

South

Note: * denotes overtime period(s)

1991

North

South

Note: * denotes overtime period(s)

1992

North

South

Note: * denotes overtime period(s)

1993

Note: teams in italics were division champions.

Note: * denotes overtime period(s)

1994

Note: teams in italics were division champions.

Note: * denotes overtime period(s)

1995

Note: teams in italics were division champions.

Note: * denotes overtime period(s)

1996

Note: teams in italics were division champions.

Note: * denotes overtime period(s)

1997

Note: teams in italics were division champions.

Note: * denotes overtime period(s)

1998

Note: teams in italics were division champions.

Note: * denotes overtime period(s)

1999

Note: * denotes overtime period(s)

2000

Note: * denotes overtime period(s)

2001

Note: * denotes overtime period(s)

2002

Note: * denotes overtime period(s)

2003

Note: * denotes overtime period(s)

2004

Note: * denotes overtime period(s)

2005

Note: * denotes overtime period(s)

2006

Note: * denotes overtime period(s)

2007

Note: * denotes overtime period(s)

2008

Note: * denotes overtime period(s)

2009

Note: * denotes overtime period(s)

2010

Note: * denotes overtime period(s)

2011

Note: * denotes overtime period(s)

2012

Note: * denotes overtime period(s)

2013

Note: * denotes overtime period(s)

2014

Note: * denotes overtime period(s)

2015

Note: * denotes overtime period(s)

2016

Note: * denotes overtime period(s)

See also
 ECAC 2 TournamentCommonwealth Coast Conference ice hockey Tournament

References

Ice hockey
Recurring sporting events established in 1972
Recurring sporting events disestablished in 2016